is a Japanese television announcer for the Akita Broadcasting System in Akita. She was born to a Japanese mother and an Australian father in Tokyo. She earned her academic degree in Economics from Keio University and served as a Chuo-ku Sightseeing ambassador in 2016.

Honors and award
 2017 Swadesh DeRoy Scholarship Award Pen Award 1st Place

References

1995 births
Living people
Akita Northern Happinets
Japanese announcers
Keio University alumni